The Reuter concession was a contract signed in 1872 between Baron Julius de Reuter (born Israel Beer Josaphat), a British banker and businessman, and Naser al-Din Shah, Qajar king of Persia. The concession gave him control over Persian roads, telegraphs, mills, factories, extraction of resources, and other public works in exchange for a stipulated sum for 5 years and 60. The concession was met with not only domestic outrage in the form of local protests, but the Russian government was hostile towards the concession as well. Under immense pressure, Naser al-Din Shah consequently cancelled the agreement despite his deteriorating financial situation. The concession cancellation was also due to the British government refusing to support Reuter's unrealistic ambitions. While the concession lasted for approximately a year, the entire debacle set the foundation for the revolts against the tobacco concession in 1890 as it demonstrated that any attempt by a foreign power to infringe upon Iranian sovereignty would infuriate the local population as well as rival European powers, in this case the Russian government, which had its own interests in the region.

The Reuter concession's cancellation, however, resulted in the second Reuter concession, which led to the formation of Imperial Bank of Persia by Baron de Reuter.

References 

1872 in Iran
1872 treaties
1872 documents
Iran–United Kingdom relations
Agreements
Reuters
Politics of Qajar Iran